The Mattei Affair is a 1972 Italian drama film directed by Francesco Rosi. It depicts the life and mysterious death of Enrico Mattei, an Italian businessman who in the aftermath of World War II managed to avoid the sale of the nascent Italian oil and hydrocarbon industry to US companies and developed them in the Eni, a state-owned oil company which rivaled the "Seven Sisters" for oil and gas deals in Northern African and Middle Eastern countries.

The film shared the Grand Prix with The Working Class Goes to Heaven at the 1972 Cannes Film Festival. Italian star Gian Maria Volonté was the leading actor in both films.

The film is an innovative hybrid of documentary and fiction, representing Francesco Rosi's concept of cine-inchieste (film investigation). The flashback structure shows the influence of Citizen Kane and Rosi's Salvatore Giuliano (1962). Rosi remains faithful to his neo-realist roots with on-location shooting and non-professional actors. The film is interspersed with footage of the director trying to find his friend, the investigative journalist Mauro De Mauro, who disappeared while doing research for the film. He was killed by the Sicilian Mafia, but like the death of Mattei, De Mauro's case was never solved.

Cast
 Gian Maria Volonté - Enrico Mattei
 Luigi Squarzina - Journalist
 Furio Colombo - assistant
 Gianfranco Ombuen - Ing. Ferrari
 Edda Ferronao - Mrs. Mattei
 Accursio Di Leo - Sicilian important man #1
 Giuseppe Lo Presti - Sicilian important man #2
 Aldo Barberito - Journalist Mauro De Mauro
 Dario Michaelis - Carabinieri official
 Peter Baldwin - McHale (journalist)
 Franco Graziosi - Minister
 Elio Jotta - Head of commission
 Luciano Colitti - Bertuzzi
 Terenzio Cordova - Police official
 Camillo Milli - Change teller
 Jean Rougeul - American official
 Francesco Rosi - himself

References

External links
 

1972 films
1970s business films
Films about the Sicilian Mafia
Films directed by Francesco Rosi
Films set in 1962
Films set in the 1950s
Italian drama films
1970s Italian-language films
Palme d'Or winners
Films with screenplays by Tonino Guerra
Films scored by Piero Piccioni
1970s Italian films